Richárd Bodó (born 13 March 1993) is a Hungarian handballer for SC Pick Szeged and the Hungarian national team.

He represented Hungary at the 2019 World Men's Handball Championship.

Achievements
Nemzeti Bajnokság I:
Winner: 2018, 2021, 2022
'Magyar KupaWinner'': 2019

Individual awards
Hungarian Handballer of the Year: 2018

References

External links
Oregfiuk.hu
Tatabanyahandball.com

1993 births
Living people
Hungarian male handball players
People from Mátészalka
SC Pick Szeged players
Sportspeople from Szabolcs-Szatmár-Bereg County